Sky Academy Arts Scholarship was a scholarship award for artists, launched in 2011 by Sky and run in conjunction with IdeasTap and Hiive (Now Screenskills). The annual scholarship supported selected artists and creative individuals under the age of 30 with a £30,000 bursary and mentor support to help them develop to the next stage of their careers. It was part of the Sky Academy programme from 2013 until its final year in 2016.

History
The Sky Academy Arts Scholarship originally started as the Sky Arts Ignition:Futures Fund in 2011, before becoming part of the new Sky Academy in 2013. Applicants were required to complete an application detailing the project they would complete while they were on the scholarship, and with around a 1000 applicants a year this would be whittled down for a panel of art experts to make the final decision. The panel changed each year and former members have included Godfrey Worsdale (former Director of BALTIC Contemporary Art Gallery); Louise Jeffreys  (Director of Arts, Barbican); Radio presenter Jo Whiley; Nancy Durrant (Arts Commissioning Editor for The Times); Iwona Blazwick (Director of Whitechapel Gallery); Cam Blackwood (Music producer).

Melvyn Bragg, who was an ambassador at the Sky Academy stated "I genuinely believe that the Sky Arts Scholarships are a substantial and far-sighted contribution to the best arts practice in this country,
and already we see tremendous talents being encouraged and developed as a result of it" and in an interview with the Radio Times he said about the scholarship "People seem to think the arts just pop out of the ground. They don’t. Young people need support, and our scheme should be replicated all over the place. The National Theatre, the Royal Shakespeare Company and the Royal Opera House all get whacking great subsidies from us as taxpayers. Why don’t each of them sponsor five or ten scholarships a year?"  The winners of the scholarships were announced at the South Bank Sky Arts Awards until 2016 when the scholarship was dropped.

Winners of the scholarship have included Mark Simpson who went onto win the South Bank Sky Arts Award for Classical Music which he wrote while on his scholarship, while Sabrina Mahfouz whose Edinburgh Festival play Chef was written during her scholarship and won the Fringe First Award.

Past Scholars

See also

 List of European art awards

References

British art awards
Awards established in 2011
Arts in the Republic of Ireland
Sky Group